Etamiphylline or etamiphyllin (INN) is a xanthine intended for use as an anti-asthma agent. It has shown poor to absent effects in human clinical trials.

References

Xanthines
Diethylamino compounds